Gordon Leigh Slade (October 9, 1904 – January 2, 1974), nicknamed Oskie, was an American professional baseball shortstop. He played six seasons in Major League Baseball (MLB) from 1930 to 1935 for the Brooklyn Robins/Dodgers, St. Louis Cardinals, and Cincinnati Reds. As a member of the Brooklyn Dodgers in 1932, Slade was thrown out of a game for arguing by National League umpire Charlie Moran.

In 437 games over six seasons, Slade posted a .257 batting average (353-for-1372) with 147 runs, 60 doubles, 11 triples, 8 home runs, 123 RBI and 84 bases on balls. He finished his career with an overall .953 fielding percentage.

See also
List of Major League Baseball players with a home run in their first major league at bat

References

External links

1904 births
1974 deaths
Major League Baseball shortstops
Brooklyn Robins players
Brooklyn Dodgers players
St. Louis Cardinals players
Cincinnati Reds players
Baseball players from Utah
Vernon Tigers players
Mission Bells players
Mission Reds players
Columbus Red Birds players
St. Paul Saints (AA) players
Hollywood Stars players
Portland Beavers players
Oakland Oaks (baseball) players